Doggy Bag is the second studio album by American rapper Lil' Bow Wow. It was released on December 18, 2001 through So So Def Recordings and Columbia Records. Recording sessions for the album took place from 2000 to 2001. The production on the album was primarily handled by Jermaine Dupri and Bryan-Michael Cox. The album also features guest appearances by Jagged Edge, Da Brat and Xscape among others.
 
Doggy Bag was supported by two singles: the first single "Thank You", which samples The Cars' "I'm Not the One", and the second single "Take Ya Home", which was also featured on the soundtrack to Lil' Bow Wow's 2002 film, Like Mike. The album received generally mixed reviews from music critics but was commercially successful, debuting at number eleven on the US Billboard 200 chart and selling 320,000 copies in its first week.

Commercial performance
On January 23, 2002, the album was certified platinum by the Recording Industry Association of America (RIAA) for shipments of over a million copies. As of December 2006, the album has sold 1.1 million copies in the United States, according to Nielsen Soundscan.

Track listing

(*) denotes co-producer.

Notes
Track 1, "We Want Weezy (Intro)" features uncredited vocals by Jermaine Dupri.
Track 2, "Take Ya Home" features uncredited vocals by Aaliyah Minter and Khim Davis.
Track 9, "Crazy" features uncredited vocals by Sleepy Brown.

Sample credits
Track 1, "We Want Weezy (Intro)" samples "We Want Eazy" as performed by Eazy-E, and written by Eric Wright, George Clinton and Maceo Parker. And "Ahh...The Name Is Bootsy, Baby" written by Bootsy Collins, George Clinton, and Maceo Parker.
Track 2, "Thank You" samples "I'm Not the One" as performed by The Cars, and written by Ric Ocasek.
Track 3, "Take Ya Home" samples "Have a Nice Day" as performed by Roxanne Shanté.
Track 6, "All I Know" samples "Candy Girl" as performed by New Edition, and written by Larry Johnson, Michael Edwin Johnson, Dennis Lambert, August Moon, Brian Potter and Tyrone Thomas.

Personnel 
Credits taken from Allmusic site.

Sleepy Brown - vocals
Teresa Caldwell - stylist
Andrew Coleman - recording
Bryan-Michael Cox - production
Jermaine Dupri - executive producer, production, vocal production
Kris Feldman - art director, design
Brian Frye - recording
Bernie Grundman - mastering
John Horesco IV - engineering assistant

LaMarquis Jefferson - bass guitar
Brian "Bonehead" Kinkead - vocal engineering
Diane McDonald - A&R
Tadd Mingo - assistant
Jonathan Mannion - photography
The Neptunes - mixing
Billy Odum - guitar
Phil Tan - mixing
Eddie "Skeeter Rock" Weathers - A&R

Charts

Weekly charts

Year-end charts

Certifications

References

2001 albums
Bow Wow (rapper) albums
So So Def Recordings albums
Albums produced by Bryan-Michael Cox
Albums produced by Jermaine Dupri
Albums produced by the Neptunes